The Patna–Sasaram Passenger is an Express train belonging to East Central Railway zone that runs between  and  in India. It is currently being operated with 53211/53212 train numbers on a daily basis.

Service

The 53211/Patna–Sasaram Passenger has an average speed of 33 km/hr and covers 146 km in 4h 25m. The 53212/Sasaram–Patna Passenger has an average speed of 26 km/hr and covers 146 km in 5h 35m.

Route and halts 

The important halts of the train are:

Coach composition

The train has standard ICF rakes with max speed of 110 kmph. The train consists of 14 coaches:

 12 General
 2 Seating cum Luggage Rake

Traction

Both trains are hauled by a Mughal Sarai Loco Shed-based WDM-3A  diesel locomotive from Patna to Gaya and vice versa.

Rake sharing 

The train shares its rake with

 13249/13250 Patna–Bhabua Road Intercity Express
 13243/13244 Patna–Bhabua Road Intercity Express (via Gaya)
 53213/53214 Patna–Gaya Passenger

See also 

 Patna Junction railway station
 Bhabua Road railway station
 Patna–Bhabua Road Intercity Express (via Gaya)
 Patna–Bhabua Road Intercity Express
 Patna–Gaya Passenger

Notes

References

External links 

 Patna–Sasaram Passenger
 Sasaram–Patna Passenger

Transport in Patna
Slow and fast passenger trains in India
Rail transport in Bihar